Gesticulate is the debut studio album by Non-Aggression Pact, released in 1992 by GPC Productions.

Reception

William I. Lengeman III of AllMusic notes the "hard-edged industrial-styled beats (b.p.m. included) from Jason Whitcomb and Jeff Hillard on a variety of electronics, percussion and vocals, with guest bass and piano from Dan Bates. Several of the 12 tracks feature vocals, and the rest are sample-heavy instrumentals."

Track listing

Personnel
Adapted from the Gesticulate liner notes.

Non-Aggression Pact
 Jeff Hillard – drums, keyboards, sampler, programming, remix (2, 12)
 Jason Whitcomb – lead vocals, keyboards, sampler, programming

Additional performers
 Dan Bates – bass guitar (3, 8), piano (8)

Production and design
 Shaun Egger – recording 
 Paul Rowe – cover art, design

Release history

References

External links 
 

1992 debut albums
Non-Aggression Pact (band) albums
GPC Productions albums